The Nuestra Belleza Paraguay 2013 pageant was held at the Yacht & Golf Club Paraguayo on June 27, 2013 to select Paraguayan representatives to the 4 major beauty pageants. Egny Eckert, Miss Universe Paraguay 2012, Fiorella Migiore, Miss World Paraguay 2012, Nicole Huber, Miss International Paraguay 2012, and Alexandra Fretes, Miss Earth Paraguay 2012, crowned their successors, Guadalupe Gonzalez, Coral Ruiz, Marta Raviolo and Karen Duarte, respectively. This is the first time that the pageant was broadcast on LaTele, with new franchises holders, Salvador Mass and Isabel Mussi, and with a new name, 'Nuestra Belleza'.

Results

* Karen Duarte later withdrew for health reasons. The 1st runner-up, Leticia Cáceres, replaced her at Miss Earth 2013.

Contestants notes
Candidates # 4 and # 9, Coral and Paloma Ruiz Reyes, are siblings. 
Candidate # 4, Coral Ruiz Reyes, previously joined Miss Universo Paraguay 2011 where she finished as 1st Runner-up, she later represented her country at Miss Tourism Queen of The Year Internacional 2012 held in China.
Candidate # 5, Guadalupe González, already represented Paraguay at Miss Atlántico International 2012 and Miss Latinoamérica 2012, held in Punta del Este, Uruguay, and Panamá City, Panamá, respectively.
Candidate # 13, Daisy Lezcano, previously joined Miss Paraguay 2012 and she took the Miss Model of the World Paraguay crown.
Candidate # 7, Marta Raviolo, was Miss Caaguazú 2009, participating at Miss Paraguay 2009, this pageant send their winners at Miss Globe and Reina Internacional del Café among other pageants. At the end of the event she finished as 1st Runner-up.
Candidate # 10, Marcela Benegas, previously joined Miss Universo Paraguay 2008 but she did not placed.

Representation
After the pageant, the following contestants represented Paraguay in these international contests:

Judges
The following persons judged the final competition:
Bettina Barboza de Ray, Miss Paraguay 1995
Luis Carlos Adler Benítez
Daiana Da Costa Ferreira, Miss Internacional Paraguay 2007
Juan José Martínez
Arnaldo Samaniego, mayor of the city of Asunción
Carlos Aviles
Vivian Benítez, Miss Paraguay 1991
Robert Aveiro 
José Espínola, stylist
Federico Duarte Macchi

See also
Miss Paraguay
Miss Universe 2013
Miss World 2013
Miss International 2013
Miss Earth 2013
Miss United Continent 2013

External links
Promociones Gloria, holder of the franchises.
Nuestra Belleza Paraguay Facebook Page

References

2013
2013 beauty pageants
2013 in Paraguay
June 2013 events in South America